Opoka-Kolonia Józefin  is a village in the administrative district of Gmina Annopol, within Kraśnik County, Lublin Voivodeship, in eastern Poland.

The village has a population of 14.

References

Villages in Kraśnik County